Edward Kellett (7 November 1864 – 15 May 1922) was a New Zealand Independent Labour Member of Parliament for a Dunedin electorate.

Biography

Kellett was born in Dunedin and served on the West Harbour Borough Council until 1919. He served on the Dunedin City Council from 1917 to 1919. During the First World War Kellett supported conscription and resigned from the Labour Party in 1916. He was an executive member of the Welfare League organised by former Labour Leader David McLaren.

Kellett represented the electorate until his death on 15 May 1922.

Kellett was ill for several months. He underwent a serious operation and six weeks after that, he died.

Notes

References
Three Party Politics in New Zealand, 1911–1931 by Michael Bassett (1982, Historical Publications, Auckland)

Independent MPs of New Zealand
Dunedin City Councillors
New Zealand trade unionists
1864 births
1922 deaths
New Zealand MPs for Dunedin electorates
New Zealand Labour Party politicians
Burials at Dunedin Northern Cemetery
Members of the New Zealand House of Representatives